The 2016 NACAM Rally Championship was the ninth season of the NACAM Rally Championship. This championship was the FIA regional rally championship for the North America and Central America (NACAM) region. The season began 8 April in Oaxaca, Mexico, and ended 22 October in Costa Rica, after five events.

Rallies in Panama and Jamaica were dropped from the championship in favour of a second event in Costa Rica, the Rally La Ponderosa and for the first time, a rally in Canada, the Rallye Baie-des-Chaleurs in New Richmond, Quebec. Apart from this new event, the other four rallies were single day events.

Defending champion Ricardo Triviño won his seventh NACAM championship. Triviño won the first four events of the series. Season-long rival Francisco Name Jr. was second in those same events and won the final rally of the year but was still 24 points behind Triviño. They were the only two drivers to pursue the entire championship. Third in the championship, Miguel Medina drove only the first two events in Mexico finishing third in both.

Event calendar and results

The 2016 NACAM Rally Championship was as follows:

Championship standings
The 2016 NACAM Rally Championship points are as follows:

References

External links

NACAM Rally Championship
NACAM
NACAM Rally Championship
NACAM Rally Championship